Shugli–Jugli (formerly known as Santa Banta), also known as Shugli Jodi, is a stand-up comedy duo consisting of two brothers Shugli and Jugli. The team is primarily known for humorous comedy. It is associated with Doordarshan since 1988 and has appeared in eight hundred uncertain double act shows, including in Bangkok, Singapore and Toronto.

In 2015, the two changed their original stage name following indecent Santa Banta-related social media contents posted under their names that allegedly targeted specific minority community such as Sikhs.

Background 
Santa (now Shugli) was born as
Gurpreet Singh and Banta (now Jugli) was born as Prabhpreet Singh in Punjab, India. Santa Banta is a character originally created by Khushwant Singh, an India author. The duo became known as Santa Banta in 1997 or earlier when a producer asked the team to choose it as stage name.

Career 
The two started professional career in 1988 with Doordarshan's comedy programme titled Sandali, and later in 1955, duo appeared in Raunak Mela, Lara Lappa and Bach Ke Mod To TV programmes. The two later created 104 short episodes in 2000 after a production company was formed by Banta, the younger brother. It was also assigned by the government to perform in TV shows during the 1984 anti-Sikh riots under the government security.

Controversies 
The duo changed its stage name after the two were criticised for being responsible for practicing sardarji jokes during stand-up shows, leading to numerous social media posts of offensive content under their names.

In 2016, the Shiromani Gurdwara Parbandhak Committee filed a petition to the Supreme Court of India to prohibit people from posting Santa Banta-related contents online. Later in 2017, the Supreme Court delivered its verdict and declined to formulate constitutional guidelines against the petition, citing "the courts cannot lay down moral guidelines for citizens".

References

Further reading 
 
 

Indian comedy duos
Indian stand-up comedians
Comedy theatre characters
Male characters in theatre
Theatre characters introduced in 1988
People from Jalandhar